Rob or Robert McAlpine may refer to:

Sir Robert McAlpine, 1st Baronet (1847–1934), Scottish businessman, founder of the construction company Sir Robert McAlpine Ltd.
Robert Edwin McAlpine, Baron McAlpine of Moffat (1907–1990), British businessman, leader of the construction company Sir Robert McAlpine Ltd., grandson of Sir Robert
Alistair McAlpine, Baron McAlpine of West Green (born Robert Alistair McAlpine, 1942–2014), British Conservative peer
Sir Robert McAlpine, a construction company
Rob McAlpine (born 1991), Scottish rugby player

Macalpine, Robert